is a Japanese light novel written by Romeo Tanaka, with illustrations by Mebae, published by Shogakukan under their Gagaga Bunko imprint in July 2008. A manga adaptation by Kōichirō Hoshino was serialized in Shogakukan's Shōnen Sunday S between February 2012 and March 2013. An anime film by AIC ASTA premiered in April 2013.

Plot
Ichiro Sato formerly suffered from a case of youthful delusions of fantasy and grandeur, which caused him to be bullied throughout middle school. Now in high school, he strives to be a normal student. Unfortunately, his teacher has entrusted him with the care of a girl with a similar case of delusions.

Characters

Media

Light novel
Aura: Maryūin Kōga Saigo no Tatakai is a 360-page light novel written by Romeo Tanaka, with illustrations by Mebae. It was published on July 18, 2008, by Shogakukan under their Gagaga Bunko imprint.

Manga
A manga adaptation, illustrated by Kōichirō Hoshino, was serialized from the April 2012 issue of Shogakukan Shōnen Sunday S, released on February 25, 2012, to the May 2013 issue of the magazine, released on March 25, 2013. Four tankōbon volumes were released between July 18, 2012, and April 10, 2013.

Anime
An anime film, produced by AIC ASTA and directed by Seiji Kishi, was released in Japanese theaters on April 13, 2013, and was released on Blu-ray Disc and DVD on September 18, 2013.

References

External links
Anime film official website 

2008 Japanese novels
2012 manga
2013 anime films
Anime films based on light novels
Fantasy anime and manga
Gagaga Bunko
Japanese animated films
2010s Japanese-language films
Light novels
Romantic comedy anime and manga
School life in anime and manga
Sentai Filmworks
Shogakukan franchises
Shogakukan manga
Shōnen manga